Lujiang County is a county of Anhui Province, East China, it is under the administration of the prefecture-level city of Hefei, the capital of Anhui. It is the southernmost county-level division under the jurisdiction of the provincial capital, Hefei. The government of Lujiang County is located in Lucheng Town.

Lujiang County has jurisdiction over 17 towns.

During the Spring and Autumn Period, the Lujiang area was the location of the minor State of Shu (舒).

Administrative divisions
Lujiang County is divided to 17 towns.
Towns

Climate

References

External links

County-level divisions of Anhui
Hefei